What You See Is What You Get is the second studio album by American country music singer Luke Combs, released on November 8, 2019, through River House Artists and Columbia Nashville. It includes all five songs previously featured on the 2019 EP The Prequel, including the singles "Beer Never Broke My Heart" and "Even Though I'm Leaving" in addition to the track "1, 2 Many" (a collaboration with Brooks & Dunn), the single "Does to Me", and later the promotional single "Six Feet Apart". Combs toured North America throughout the remainder of 2019 and was to headline the C2C: Country to Country festival in Europe in 2020 in promotion of the album, however the festival was canceled due to the COVID-19 pandemic. Seven singles from the album, "Beer Never Broke My Heart", "Even Though I'm Leaving", "Does to Me", "Lovin' on You", "Better Together", "Forever After All" and "Cold As You", reached number-one on the Billboard Country Airplay chart.

Background
Combs said his intention with new track "1, 2 Many" was to "write a song that I felt like my '90s country music heroes would be proud of". It marks his second collaboration with Brooks & Dunn, with his first being a cover of their debut single "Brand New Man" on their album Reboot.

"Six Feet Apart", a standalone song released on May 1, 2020 in response to the COVID-19 pandemic, was later added to the end of the album's digital and streaming editions.

On August 20, Combs announced that the album will be re-released as a deluxe album titled What You See Ain't Always What You Get on October 23, 2020, featuring "Six Feet Apart", as well as five new songs. The first of the new songs "Without You" was released as a promotional single on September 18.

Commercial performance
What You See Is What You Get debuted atop the US Billboard 200 on the chart dated November 23, 2019, earning 172,000 album-equivalent units, including 109,000 pure album sales. In addition to becoming Combs' first US number-one album, it opened with the "largest week for a country album" since 2018, and became the biggest week in terms of streams for a country album on record. The album has sold 350,000 copies in the United States as of March 2020, with 1,000,000 units consumed in total. After its reissue, on the chart dated November 7, 2020, the album returned to the top spot from number 21, selling 109,000 album-equivalent units. In the same week, the album broke the record for the most streams for a country record at 102.26 million streams. At 11 months and 15 days, What You See Is What You Get also became the first album since Bon Jovi's This House Is Not for Sale to return to number one after an extended wait.  It was among the top 10 albums of 2020, with 1.475 million equivalent album unit consumed (184,000 in pure sales) that year.

The album also topped the ARIA Albums Chart in Australia, becoming Combs's first number-one album there.

Track listing

Personnel

From What You See Is What You Get liner notes.

Musicians
Luke Combs – lead and background vocals
Brooks & Dunn – vocals on "1, 2 Many"
Eric Church – vocals on "Does to Me"
Dave Cohen – piano, organ, synthesizer
Jon Conley – electric guitar, acoustic guitar, banjo
Doug Frasure – drums
Aubrey Haynie – fiddle
Wil Houchens – piano, organ, synthesizer
Ben Jordan – bass guitar
Buddy Leach – saxophone
Tim Marks – bass guitar
Carl Miner – acoustic guitar, banjo, mandolin
Scott Moffatt – background vocals, electric guitar, acoustic guitar, banjo, synthesizer, percussion, glockenspiel, clapping, programming
Gary Morse – pedal steel guitar, lap steel guitar
Sol Philcox-Littlefield – electric guitar, slide guitar
Jerry Roe – drums
Jimmie Lee Sloas – bass guitar
Ilya Toshinsky – acoustic guitar, mandolin

Technical
Luke Armentrout – mastering assistant
Nick Autry – engineering of Brooks & Dunn's vocals on "1, 2 Many"
Taylor Chadwick – mastering assistant
Jim Cooley – mixing (1–5, 7, 8–10, 12, 13, 15, 16)
Andrew Darby – mastering assistant
Dan Davis – engineering assistant
Bobbi Giel – mastering assistant
Mike Gillies – digital editing
Alex Gilson – engineering
Rob Hendon – cover artist
Travis Humbert – session cleanup
Mike Kyle – engineering of Brooks & Dunn's vocals on "1, 2 Many"
Kam Luchterhand – engineering assistant
Andrew Mendelson – mastering
Scott Moffatt – producer; mixing (6, 7, 14, 16, 17)
Seth Morton – engineering assistant
Jason Mott – engineering assistant
Allen Parker – engineering of Eric Church's vocals on "Does to Me"
Megan Peterson – mastering assistant
Joey Stanca – engineering assistant
Preston White – engineering assistant

What You See Ain't Always What You Get credits
From What You See Ain't Always What You Get (18-23) liner notes.

Musicians
Luke Combs – lead vocals
Jim "Moose" Brown – organ, piano
Perry Coleman – background vocals
Jon Conley – acoustic guitar, mandolin, banjo
Wes Hightower – background vocals
Steve Mackey – bass guitar
Chip Matthews – acoustic guitar, electric guitar, baritone guitar, programming, background vocals
Rob McNelley – electric guitar
Gary Morse – pedal steel guitar
Sol Philcox-Littlefield – electric guitar
Danny Rader – acoustic guitar, electric guitar, mandolin
Jerry Roe – drums, percussion
Amanda Shires – fiddle on "Without You"
Jonathan Singleton – electric guitar, resonator guitar, bouzouki, background vocals
Russell Terrell – background vocals

Technical
Spencer Clark – recording assistant on "Six Feet Apart"
Luke Combs – producer
Jim Cooley – mixing (19, 21)
Justin Francis – recording assistant (19-23)
Ted Jensen – mastering
Scott Johnson – production assistance 
Chip Matthews – producer, recording, additional recording, digital editing, mixing (18, 20, 22, 23)
Jonathan Singleton – producer (19-23)

Charts

Weekly charts

Year-end charts

Certifications

References

2019 albums
Albums produced by Jonathan Singleton
Albums produced by Luke Combs
Luke Combs albums
Columbia Records albums